Baran railway station is a railway station in Baran district, Rajasthan. Its code is BAZ. It serves Baran city. The station consists of 3 platforms. Passenger, Express, and Superfast trains halt here.
Some important trains are as:
14813/14 Bhopal-Jodhpur Passenger Express, 19811/12 Kota-Etawah Express, 22983/84 Indore-Kota Intercity Express, 12181/82 Jabalpur-Ajmer Dayodaya Express, 11603/04 Kota-Bina MEMU Train etc.

References

Railway stations in Baran district
Kota railway division